Nourdine Bourhane (born in 1950 in Mamoudzou, Mayotte) is a politician from the Comoros and one of the Vice Presidents of the Comoros from May 2011 to May 2016. Previously, Bourhane served as prime minister of Comoros from December 1997 to May 1998.

He has also served as minister of several cabinet departments between 1990 and 1998, including health, posts and telecommunications, youth and sports, economy and planning.

References

1950 births
Living people
Prime Ministers of the Comoros
Vice-presidents of the Comoros
Government ministers of the Comoros
Health ministers of the Comoros
People from Anjouan
People from Mayotte